Rock Art Research is a biannual peer-reviewed academic journal covering rock art and other forms of paleoart. It is published by the International Federation of Rock Art Organizations (IFRAO) and the Australian Rock Art Research Association (AURA) and was established in 1984. It is the only refereed journal specifically dedicated to the field of prehistoric art and is listed by several indexing services and by rating agencies such as Scopus (Cite Score 0.44, SJR 0.276, SNIP 0.625).

Rock Art Research is distributed worldwide and as of December 2016, has published 1218 signed contributions by a total of over 350 authors. The journal bridges numerous disciplines, including geochemistry, geomorphology, art history, ethnography, conservation science, human evolution, anthropology, archaeology, semiotics and others, with an editorial emphasis on the hard sciences. It has been instrumental in guiding the discipline for a third of a century.

External links 
 

Archaeology journals
Publications established in 1984
Biannual journals
Academic journals published by learned and professional societies
English-language journals